Slatina is a town in the Slavonia region of Croatia. It was ruled by Ottoman Empire between 1542 and 1687, when it was captured by Austrian troops. During Ottoman rule it was initially part of Sanjak of Pojega between 1542 and 1601, latterly part of Sanjak of Rahoviçe between 1601 and 1687. It was district centre at Virovitica County in Kingdom of Croatia-Slavonia between 1868 and 1918.

"Slatina" means "salt lake" in Croatian. However, there is no salt lake there any more.

Demographics
The population of the town is 10,152 (2011), with a total of 13,609 in the municipality, composed of the following settlements:

 Bakić, population 537
 Bistrica, population 165
 Donji Meljani, population 259
 Golenić, population 22
 Gornji Miholjac, population 304
 Ivanbrijeg, population 30
 Kozice, population 511
 Lukavac, population 99
 Markovo, population 131
 Medinci, population 200
 Novi Senkovac, population 301
 Radosavci, population 99
 Sladojevački Lug, population 90
 Sladojevci, population 730
 Slatina, population 10,208

In 2001, 85.5% of the population were Croats.

References

External links

 Slatina official web site
 Slatina Tourist Board
 Slatina Radio Station
 Slatina.net – Independent City Portal

Cities and towns in Croatia
Slavonia
Virovitica County
Populated places in Virovitica-Podravina County